

The Mowla Bluff massacre was an incident involving the murder of a number of Indigenous Australians at Geegully Creek, near Mowla Bluff, in the Kimberley region of Western Australia in 1916.

Responding to the brutality of the white station manager, some local men gave him a beating. In reprisal, an armed mob which included officials and residents rounded up a large number of Aboriginal men, women and children who were then shot. The bodies were burned.

A belated police investigation into the events took place in 1918, after two survivors were found with the bullets still within their bodies.

One account states that three or four hundred people were killed and only three survived.

In 2000 a memorial plaque was erected in Geegully Creek, Mowla Bluff, to commemorate the victims of the massacre.

A documentary film about the massacre, Whispering in our Hearts: The Mowla Bluff Massacre, was released in 2001.

See also
List of massacres in Australia

References

External links
Mowla Bluff memorial signals new beginning
Whispering in Our Hearts
Closing the circle on a bloody chapter, Sydney Morning Herald

Further reading
 Mason, Flur-Elise. Story must be told. about Whispering in our hearts (Motion picture) Broome Advertiser, 22 Aug. 2001, p. 11

1916 in Australia
Mass murder in 1916
Massacres in 1916
History of Australia (1901–1945)
Kimberley (Western Australia)
Death in Western Australia
Massacres of Indigenous Australians
Mass shootings in Australia
Police misconduct in Australia
1910s in Western Australia
1910s mass shootings in Australia
Murder in Western Australia
1916 murders in Australia